Mostafa Katiraei was an Iranian engineer and politician who served in the interim government of Bazargan as the minister of housing. He was also a member of the Council of the Islamic Revolution.

Katiraei was a leading member of the Islamic Association of Engineers and considered sympathetic towards the Freedom Movement of Iran.

Electoral history

References

1928 births
2016 deaths
Government ministers of Iran
Council of the Islamic Revolution members
Freedom Movement of Iran politicians
Members of the Association for Defense of Freedom and the Sovereignty of the Iranian Nation